Jonathan I. Rosenblatt (born August 31, 1956) is an American Modern Orthodox rabbi, teacher, lecturer, and counselor.

Biography
A native of Baltimore, Rosenblatt served for more than thirty years as the Senior Rabbi of the Riverdale Jewish Center in The Bronx, New York.  Under his leadership the RJC became the largest "teaching synagogue" in the country, through its Rabbinic and Pre-rabbinic internship programs. Rabbi Rosenblatt is known for his work in bridging the gaps that divide Orthodox, Conservative, Reform and secular Jews, and for actively supporting the Oslo peace process in the Middle East. He has lectured widely in the United States, the United Kingdom, South Africa, and Israel and is often quoted on topics of concern to the Jewish community.

Rosenblatt earned a BA and MA from Johns Hopkins University in Comparative Literature and a PhD from Columbia University in Modern British Literature. He studied in Israel at Yeshivat Har Etzion and was ordained by the Rabbi Isaac Elchanan Theological Seminary of Yeshiva University.

Rosenblatt is the great-grandson of celebrated cantor Yossele Rosenblatt, and the grandson of Rabbi Samuel Rosenblatt, founding rabbi of the Beth Tefiloh congregation in Baltimore and pioneer of the Beth Tfiloh Dahan Community School. Rabbi Rosenblatt and his wife have four children.

In November 2012, it was reported that Rosenblatt was a candidate to replace Jonathan Sacks as the Chief Rabbi of the United Synagogue. Ultimately the position went to Rabbi Ephraim Mirvis.

In February 2014, Rosenblatt delivered a lecture in his synagogue explaining his opposition to SAR High School's decision to allow two of its female students to don tefillin (phylacteries) in morning prayers. Rabbi Tully Harcsztark, the principal of SAR High School, attended the lecture. Rabbi Dr. Samuel Lebens noted that Rabbi Rosenblatt delivered a "stunning master class in how to disagree with respect and love." The talk was later uploaded to YouTube.

In June 2014, Rosenblatt was honored at the Riverdale Jewish Center's 60th Anniversary Dinner in celebration of his thirtieth year of service to the congregation. The dinner program included congratulatory video addresses by Rabbi Aharon Lichtenstein, Rabbi Mordechai Willig, the widow of Rabbi Yehuda Amital, President Richard Joel and Rabbi Yitz Greenberg, among others.

In his June 11, 2014 speech to Congress, Congressman Eliot Engel (D-NY) said Anchored by his wife Tzipporah, Rabbi Dr. Jonathan Rosenblatt has been at the helm of the RJC for nearly 30 years, and their guidance can be felt throughout the lives of those whom they have touched...My connection to the Rosenblatts is personal. Rabbi Rosenblatt is a dear friend who was a great comfort to both me and my family after my mother passed away. Rabbi Rosenblatt is truly one of the kindest and most sensitive people whom I have met. He has never proven otherwise, in each and every encounter we have had. The Riverdale Jewish Center is fortunate to have Rabbi Rosenblatt at the helm of the Shul, and I am fortunate to call him my friend.

In November 2014, Rosenblatt's brother-in-law, Rabbi Moshe Twersky, was murdered by Palestinian terrorists in a synagogue in Jerusalem.

In May 2015, the New York Times published a piece about Rosenblatt's history (in the 1980s and 1990s) of inviting teenage boys to play squash or racquetball often accompanied by sitting in a sauna naked together. There were no allegations of sexual touching or criminal conduct.

On February 25, 2016, Rosenblatt announced his plans to step aside from his role as Senior Rabbi of the Riverdale Jewish Center. A representative for the rabbi explained "Rabbi Rosenblatt is eager to leave a positive legacy for his years of service to the Riverdale Jewish Center...He is stepping down because he would like to see the community grow and he thinks in order for that to happen [the synogogue] needs a fresh start." He purportedly took a new position as a counselor at Scarsdale Integrative Medicine in Scarsdale, New York. However, a person affiliated with Scarsdale Integrative Medicine, Su Y. Heo, explained that Rosenblatt actually "was never with [Scarsdale Integrative Medicine]" and that he "was subleasing a place so he can see his own patients . . . . for a month, but he is no longer subleasing with us."

References

Living people
American Modern Orthodox rabbis
Columbia University alumni
Johns Hopkins University alumni
Religious leaders from Baltimore
People from the Bronx
Rabbi Isaac Elchanan Theological Seminary semikhah recipients
Yeshivat Har Etzion
People from Riverdale, Bronx
1956 births
21st-century American rabbis